Yuri Antónovich Mazurók (Russian Ю́рий Анто́нович Мазуро́к, 18 July 1931 in Kraśnik – 1 April 2006 in Moscow), PAU, was a Russian operatic baritone of Ukrainian ethnicity.

He sang leading roles with major opera houses internationally, including the Bolshoi Theatre, where he made his debut as Eugene Onegin, to become his most famous part, in 1963, the Canadian Opera Company, the Metropolitan Opera (La traviata, Eugene Onegin, and Tosca), the Royal Opera, London, and the Vienna State Opera.

Among Mazurok's recordings are Eugene Onegin (with Galina Vishnevskaya and Vladimir Atlantov, conducted by Mstislav Rostropovich, 1970; then with Tamara Milashkina and Atlantov, led by Mark Ermler, 1979), and Il trovatore (opposite Katia Ricciarelli, José Carreras, and Stefania Toczyska, conducted by Sir Colin Davis, 1980).  On DVD can be found a 1983 Bolshoi production of The Queen of Spades (Pique-dame), with Atlantov, Milashkina, and Elena Obraztsova.  On a 9 December 1978 DVD, Mazurok sings Escamillo in a production of Carmen at the Wiener Statsoper with Elena Obraztsova (Carmen), Plácido Domingo (Don Jose), and Isobel Buchanan (Micaela), conducted by Carlos Kleiber and directed by Franco Zeffirelli.

References 

1931 births
2006 deaths
People from Kraśnik
Operatic baritones
20th-century Russian male opera singers
Soviet male opera singers
Burials in Troyekurovskoye Cemetery